Peter Martland (born July 1947) is a historian at Cambridge University. He is a specialist in the history of the music industry, and in British and American intelligence history. He was one of the researchers for the official history of Britain's domestic intelligence service, MI5, which was published in 2009 by Christopher Andrew as In defence of the realm: The authorised history of the British Security Service (London, 2009).

In December 2016, the Financial Times stated that, along with Sir Richard Dearlove, Martland had quit the Cambridge Intelligence Seminar after concerns that it might be under infiltration by the KGB.

Selected publications
Since Records Began: EMI – the first 100 years. London, 1997.
The future of the Past. London, 2002.
Corpus Lives. Cambridge, 2003.
Lord Haw Haw: the English voice of Nazi Germany. London, 2003.
Footprints on the sands of time. California, 2005.
Recording history: the British record industry, 1888-1931. Lanham, 2013.

References

External links 
http://news.bbc.co.uk/1/hi/uk/8306475.stm

British historians
Living people
Alumni of Corpus Christi College, Cambridge
1947 births
Economic historians
British historians of espionage